Francesco Gnecchi (8 September 1847, Milan – 15 June 1919, Rome) was an Italian painter and numismatist.

Biography
Born into a wealthy family in the silk trade, the artist initially studied law at the University of Pavia before enlisting as a volunteer in the war against Austria in 1866. He combined painting with the family business until 1878 and continued to sit on the board of directors of major companies in Lombardy even afterwards. A pupil of Mosè Bianchi and Achille Formis, he focused primarily on landscape and drew upon the contemporary work of the school of Lombard Naturalism. His large output of landscapes – mostly featuring Lake Maggiore, the coast of Liguria and the Engadin – reveals a cultured artist abreast of the latest developments. Constant participation in the major Milanese and national exhibitions from 1881 to 1891 also suggests the image of a professional painter. He was also the father of verismo opera composer Vittorio Gnecchi.

Friendship with Luigi Scrosati fostered an interest in flower painting alongside the passion for collecting Roman coins that began in 1870 and saw the publication of a number of short works written together with his brother Ercole on the classification of his collection. This comprised some 20,000 items on his death in 1919 and was purchased by the state in 1923 for the Museo Nazionale Romano. The brothers also founded the 'Rivista italiana di numismatica' in 1888 and the Italian Numismatic Society in 1892. Gnecchi's work on numismatics was highly regarded internationally, gaining him the medal of the Royal Numismatic Society in 1906.

Published works
 (with Ercole Gnecchi) Le monete di Milano da Carlo Magno a Vittorio Emanuele II, 1884
 Guida numismatica universale, 1886
 Saggio di bibliografia numismatica delle zecche italiane medioevali e moderne, 1889
 Monete romane, 1896 (English ed.: Roman Coins, 1903)
 Medaglioni romani, 1912.

References

 Elena Lissoni, Francesco Gnecchi, online catalogue Artgate by Fondazione Cariplo, 2010, CC BY-SA (source for the first revision of this article).

External links
 
 Le monete di Milano da Carlo Magno a Vittorio Emanuele II (1884) - Internet Archive
 Guida numismatica universale (1903, 4th ed.) - Internet Archive

19th-century Italian painters
19th-century Italian male artists
Italian male painters
20th-century Italian painters
20th-century Italian male artists
Italian landscape painters
Painters from Lombardy
Italian numismatists
1847 births
1919 deaths